Chernigovsky (masculine; Russian: Черниговский, Ukrainian: Чернігівський, Polish: Czernichowski), Chernigovskaya (feminine; Russian: Черниговская, Ukrainian: Чернігівська, Polish: Czernichowska), or Chernigovskoye (neuter) may refer to:
Places
Chernigovsky District, a district of Primorsky Krai, Russia
Chernigovsky (rural locality) (Chernigovskaya, Chernigovskoye), name of several rural localities in Russia

People
Andrey Chernigovsky (born 1983), Russian soccer player
Krystian Czernichowski (1930–2014), Polish basketball player
Nikifor Chernigovsky (died 1675), Polish noble
Tatyana Chernigovskaya (born 1947), Russian scientist in the field of neuroscience, psycholinguistics and theory of mind

See also
Chernihiv